Brownlow Eve (17 March 1905 – 18 May 1992) was a Bermudian sailor. He competed at the 1956 Summer Olympics and the 1960 Summer Olympics.

References

External links
 

1905 births
1992 deaths
Bermudian male sailors (sport)
Olympic sailors of Bermuda
Sailors at the 1956 Summer Olympics – Dragon
Sailors at the 1960 Summer Olympics – Dragon
Place of birth missing